The canton of Saint-André-de-l'Eure is an administrative division of the Eure department, northern France. Its borders were modified at the French canton reorganisation which came into effect in March 2015. Its seat is in Saint-André-de-l'Eure.

It consists of the following communes:

Les Authieux
La Baronnie
Bois-le-Roi
Bretagnolles
Champigny-la-Futelaye
Chavigny-Bailleul
Coudres
La Couture-Boussey
Croth
Épieds
Ézy-sur-Eure
La Forêt-du-Parc
Foucrainville
Fresney
Garennes-sur-Eure
Grossœuvre
L'Habit
Ivry-la-Bataille
Jumelles
Lignerolles
Louye
Marcilly-sur-Eure
Mesnil-sur-l'Estrée
Mouettes
Mousseaux-Neuville
Muzy
Prey
Saint-André-de-l'Eure
Saint-Georges-Motel
Saint-Germain-de-Fresney
Saint-Laurent-des-Bois
Serez

References

Cantons of Eure